Stare Miasto is a village in the administrative district of Gmina Stary Dzierzgoń, within Sztum County, Pomeranian Voivodeship, in northern Poland.

The village had 1080 inhabitants. For the history of the region, see History of Pomerania.

Today the village has a population of 290.

Historic St. Peter's and St. Paul's church 

This church was built in the late 15th century. The oldest cornerstone shows 1495 or 1496. The wooden ceiling and pews are painted in the late baroque style.

The pipe organ was built 1796 and restored and expanded 1866. The elaborate organ case survived the war damages 1945. All organ pipes, however disappeared. The mechanism of the organ fell into disrepair.

References

Stare Miasto